Carsten Ball and Travis Rettenmaier won in the final 7-64, 6–4 against Harsh Mankad and Kaes Van't Hof

Seeds

Draw

Draw

References
 Doubles Draw
 Qualifying Draw

Tail Savannah Challenger - Doubles
2009 Doubles